Mount Makiling (also known as Mount Maquiling), is an inactive stratovolcano located in the provinces of Laguna and Batangas on the island of Luzon, Philippines. The volcano has no recorded historic eruption but volcanism is still evident through geothermal features like mud spring and hot springs. South of the mountain is the Makiling-Banahaw Geothermal Plant. The Philippine Institute of Volcanology and Seismology (PHIVOLCS) classifies the volcano as "Inactive".

 
Mount Makiling is a state-owned forest reserve administered by the University of the Philippines Los Baños. Prior to its transfer to the university, the mountain was the first national park of the Philippines. Mount Makiling National Park was established on February 23, 1933, by Proclamation No. 552. However, it was decommissioned as a national park on June 20, 1963, by Republic Act no. 3523 when it was transferred to the university for use in forestry education and information.

The mountain is sacred to many pilgrims and is widely believed to be the home of an anito named Maria Makiling. It is one of the most known bundok dambanas in Calabarzon. It was declared as an ASEAN Heritage Park in 2013, with the title of "Mount Makiling Forest Reserve".

Legend
Maria Makiling was the protector and guardian of Mount Makiling located in Los Baños, Laguna. Thus, modern sightings of her were even reported. Maria Makiling is a common subject among Filipino artists, ranging from painters and sculptors to graphic novelists. Prior to the conversion of the natives to Christianity, Maria Makiling was already known as Makiling, an anito sent by Bathala in Mount Makiling to aid mankind in their daily tasks. The 'Maria' was added by the Spanish in a bid to 'rebrand' her as Catholic and to further subjugate the natives into Spanish imperialism.

The contour of the mountain is said to be that of her in a reclining position. In some accounts, Maria Makiling, while serving as an anito of Bathala in Mount Makiling, was heartbroken by a mortal man, and thus chose to remain hidden from mortal view thereafter.

History

The following are the proclamations, Republic Acts, and Executive Orders relevant to the Makiling Forest Reserve (MFR):

 Proclamation No. 106 (1910) – Makiling Forest Reserve was established with specific boundaries and placed under the Bureau of Forestry by Governor General W. Cameron Forbes to regulate the use of public forest and forest reserves in the Philippines; Makiling Forest Reserve was set aside for the purpose of establishing a forest school and for silvicultural studies.
 Proclamation No. 60 (1920) – The reserved was renamed Makiling National Botanic Gardens and placed under the Bureau of Forestry by Proclamation NO. 60 issued by Governor General Francis B. Harrison primary for scientific studies on plants and animals.
 Proclamation No. 552 (1933) –  The reserved was renamed the Makiling National Park under the Bureau of Forestry issued by Governor-General Theodore Roosevelt Jr. to serve as game refuge and for other purposes for the benefit and enjoyment of the people.
 Proclamation No. 214 (1937) – Calamba Estate block was added to the Park for forest purposes issued by President Manuel L. Quezon.
 Republic Act (RA) 826 (1952) –  Transfer of the administration of the Makiling National Park from the Bureau of Forestry to the Commission of Parks and Wildlife in order to promote effectual planning, development, maintenance and conservation of all national parks, monuments and wildlife in the country.
 Proclamation No. 692 (1960) –  Administration of the Makiling National Park was transferred from the Commission of Parks and Wildlife to the University of the Philippines (UP) issued by President Carlos P. Garcia for forestry education and research purposes of the College of Forestry, subject to the condition that said land will be conserved and preserved as a national park.
 Republic Act (RA) 3523 (1963) – The Makiling National park was disestablished and then ceded, transferred and conveyed to UP issued by Pres. Diosdado Macapagal to serve as the land resource for carrying out a program of public education and information in forestry, with end goal of promoting general public appreciation of forest values.
 Executive Order (EO) 224 (1987) – Complete jurisdiction, control and regulation of watershed areas including the Makiling Forest Reserve was given to the National Power Corporation (NPC) issued by President Corazon C. Aquino in support of the country's major program of energy development.
 Republic Act (RA) 6967 (1990) –  Administration of the Makiling Forest Reserve was finally transferred to UPLB by President Corazon C. Aquino primarily as a training laboratory for the advancement of scientific and technical knowledge on the preservation, conservation and development of forest, flora and fauna and natural resources.
 Executive Order 121 (1994) – created a Presidential Commission on Laguna Lake and Mt. Makiling Development to address urgent problems affecting the resources and to formulate a master plan for the development of the lake and the reserve which are seen as integrated ecosystems.

Places of interest

 Makiling National Scout Reservation, a campsite at the foot of Mount Makiling adjacent to U.P. Los Baños, which is being managed by the Boy Scouts of the Philippines this is the site of the 10th World Scout Jamboree in 1959 and 26th Asia-Pacific Regional Jamboree in 2009 and 2010.
 Mud Springs, a place which was known as Natugnos, is widely accepted albeit erroneously as the volcanic crater of Mount Makiling
 National Arts Center, a patch of land at the foot of Mount Makiling adjacent to U.P. Los Baños, which is being managed by the Cultural Center of the Philippines and the site of the Philippine High School for the Arts, a special school for young artist scholars
 Pook ni Maria Makiling, now closed, was an eco-tourism site adjacent to the Jamboree Site, National Arts Center and U.P. Los Baños
 University of the Philippines, Los Baños
 The CCF Mt. Makiling Recreation Center (known as MMRC) is a Christian recreation camp and retreat center owned by CCF and operated by RHI, located at Santo Tomas, Batangas on the slopes of Mt. Makiling. It is the prayer mountain and retreat center of Christ's Commission Fellowship.

Geographical features

Rivers and creeks 

 Munting River — Santo Tomas
 Siam-Siam Creek — Calamba
 Sipit Creek — Calamba
 Pansipit Creek — Calamba
 Pansol Creek — Calamba
 Dampalit River — Los Baños
 Saran Creek — Los Baños
 Pili Creek — Los Baños
 Molawin Creek — Los Baños
 Maitim River — Bay
 Calo River — Bay

Maars 
 Alligator Lake, Los Baños

Cones 

Named as hills
 La Mesa Hill, Calamba 
 Mayondon Hill, Los Baños 
 Sison Hill,  Los Baños

Named as mountains
 Mount Bijiang, Calamba 
 Mount Camotes, Calamba 
 Mount Masaia, Calamba 
 Mount Cabulugan, Bay 
 Mount Buboy, Calauan 
 Mount Bulalo, Calauan 
 Mount Tamlong, Calauan 
 Mount Olila, Alaminos

Hiking activity

Mt. Makiling is a popular hiking destination. The two major trails begin at the UPLB College of Forestry and Brgy. San Miguel, Santo Tomas, Batangas. The UPLB trail is more commonly used, taking 4–5 hours to reach the summit (Peak 2). This trail was closed in October 2007 due to trail damage wrought by Typhoon Xangsane in September 2006. The trail was closed again in December 2012 after two students were found drowned in a restricted area on the mountain. The trail was re-opened most recently in March 2013.  The second trail, known as Maktrav, starts in Santo Tomas. This route is more difficult and requires 6–7 hours to reach the summit. Both trails are generally established and safe, although throughout the years there have been occasional reports of fatal accidents and injuries, especially on the Santo Tomas side. Climbers also frequently encounter leeches along the way.

See also 
 Laguna de Bay
 Laguna Volcanic Field
 Mount Banahaw
 Mounts Banahaw–San Cristobal Protected Landscape
 Malepunyo Mountain Range

Bibliography
  (includes Makiling)

References

External links

 Official website of Makiling Center for Mountain Ecosystems
 Mobile website of Makiling Center for Mountain Ecosystems   
 https://web.archive.org/web/20161022082815/http://www.macrunners.org/ – Makiling Challenge, the longest running competitive foot race in the province of Laguna, organized by the Makiling Campus Runners.
 University of the Philippines Los Baños   
 University of the Philippines System

Mountains of the Philippines
Volcanoes of Luzon
Stratovolcanoes of the Philippines
Landforms of Laguna (province)
ASEAN heritage parks
Tourist attractions in Laguna (province)